Ruffy may refer to:


Places
 Ruffy, Victoria, a town in Victoria, Australia  
 Ruffy Brook, a stream in Minnesota

Given name or ring name
 Ruffy Biazon (born 1969), Filipino politician, Commissioner of Customs
 Ruffy Silverstein (American wrestler) (1914–1980) American professional and amateur wrestler
 Ruffy Silverstein (Canadian wrestler) (born 1972), Canadian professional wrestler

Surname
 Eugène Ruffy (1854–1919), Swiss politician
 Victor Ruffy (1823–1869), Swiss politician

See also
 Jacques Ruffié (1921–2004), French haematologist, geneticist, and anthropologist
 Ruffie or ruffies, street names for the drug Flunitrazepam
 Rufy, a character in the Japanese anime metaseries Gall Force